Constellation is an American  12-metre class racing yacht that successfully defended the 1964 America's Cup.

On 20 March 1964, Constellation completed a 4–0 victory over Sovereign in the 1964 America's Cup.

References

12-metre class yachts
America's Cup defenders
1960s sailing yachts
Sailboat type designs by Olin Stephens
Sailing yachts built in the United States
1964 America's Cup